The Embassy of Ireland in Washington, D.C. is the diplomatic mission of Ireland to the United States. It is located at 2234 Massachusetts Avenue, Northwest, Washington, D.C., at Sheridan Circle, in the Embassy Row neighborhood.

The embassy also operates Consulates-General in Atlanta, Boston, Chicago, New York City, and San Francisco.

, the current ambassador is Daniel Mulhall.

Building

Also known as the Henrietta M. Halliday House - the building is located on Massachusetts Avenue, in an area known as Embassy Row - named after the large number of embassies and diplomatic missions concentrated in the area. 

The plot of land where the building currently stands was previously owned by former Republican Governor of Louisiana William P. Kellogg - who served as governor from 1873 until 1877.

In May 1906, Kellogg sold the land to Henrietta M. Halliday for a total of $12,663. Henrietta subsequently applied and was issued a permit to build a dwelling on the land in 1908. The construction of the building was completed in June 1909. 

This semi-detached limestone structure was designed by local Washington D.C. architect William Penn Cresson. The structure itself has two major facades, with each facade facing onto Sheridan Circle and Massachusetts Avenue. The exterior is designed in a Louis XVI Style, while the interior consists of an 18th-century French and English style.

In 1911, the interior was extensively altered by Theodore Davis Boal's architecture firm, Boal & Brown.

Real estate speculator Harry Wardman briefly owned the property from 1926 until it was sold in 1930 during the Great Depression.

The property was purchased by the Government of Ireland in 1949 for $72,000.

Ambassador's Residence 

The Irish Ambassador's residence is located close to the embassy in Frederic Delano House. Constructed in 1924, the building was built by Waddy Butler Wood for Frederic Adrian Delano, the uncle of former US President Franklin D. Roosevelt.

The Irish Government purchased the residence in 1965 for IR£102,000

See also
United States Ambassador to Ireland
Embassy of the United States in Dublin
Deerfield Residence (U.S. Ambassador's Residence, Ireland)

References

External links

Embassy website

Ireland
Washington, D.C.
Ireland–United States relations
Ireland
Irish-American culture in Washington, D.C.